The title of grand domestic (mégas doméstikos) was given in the 11th–15th centuries to the commander-in-chief of the Byzantine army, directly below the Byzantine Emperor. It evolved from the earlier office of the domestic of the Schools, and came to rank as one of the senior dignities in the Byzantine state during the last centuries of its existence. From Byzantium, it was also adopted by the breakaway Empire of Trebizond, as well as by the 14th-century Serbian Empire.

History and evolution 

The title of the grand domestic is first mentioned in the 9th century, and most likely derives from the older office of domestikos tōn scholōn ("Domestic of the Schools"), with the epithet megas added to connote the supreme authority of its holder, following contemporary practice evident in other offices as well. Both titles appear to have co-existed for a time, with the grand domestic being a more exalted variant of the plain titles of the domestics of the East and of the West, until the late 11th century, when it became a distinct office and replaced the ordinary domestics as commander-in-chief. Nevertheless, the office was still sometimes referred to in the sources as the "Grand Domestic of the Schools" or "of the army", creating some confusion as to which of the two posts is meant. For most of its existence, the office of Grand Domestic was by its nature confined to a single holder. However, the presence of "Grand Domestics of the East/West" in the late 12th century may indicate the resumption of the well-established practice of dividing supreme field command, as with the Domesticate of the Schools, between east (Asia Minor) and west (Balkans), while in the late 14th century several people appear to hold the office at the same time, perhaps in a collegial manner.

Following the Fourth Crusade, it appears that in the Latin Empire and the other Latin states formed on Byzantine soil, the title of megas domestikos was used as the Greek equivalent of the Western title of [grand] seneschal. In the Palaiologan period (1261–1453), the grand domestic was the unchallenged commander-in-chief of the army, except in the case of the emperor campaigning in person, when he functioned as a kind of chief of staff. Despite its purely military nature, the office was also bestowed in the way of an honorific dignity to generals and high-ranking courtiers alike, e.g. to George Mouzalon, or to the Prince of Achaea William II of Villehardouin.

The office varied in importance in the court hierarchy. Under the Komnenian emperors, it came immediately after the "imperial" titles of Caesar, sebastokratōr and despotēs. It was not until the award of the title to John Kantakouzenos in the 1320s that the office firmly established itself once again as the highest non-imperial title, at the fourth place of the palace hierarchy. At all times, however, it was regarded as one of the most important and prestigious positions, and was held either by members of the reigning dynasty or by close relatives from the small circle of families connected to the imperial clan. Like all Byzantine offices, it was neither hereditary nor transferable, and its bestowal was the province of the reigning emperor. The office also included various ceremonial functions, as detailed in the mid-14th century account of offices of pseudo-Kodinos.

The grand domestic's distinctive insignia are given by pseudo-Kodinos as follows:

 A skiadion hat in red and gold, decorated with embroideries in the klapoton style, with a veil and pendants in the same style. Alternatively, a domed skaranikon hat could be worn, again in red and gold, with a portrait of the emperor, standing crowned and flanked by angels, within a circle of pearls, in front. The skaranikon itself was also bordered with pearls.
 A rich silk tunic, the kabbadion, of two colours, decorated with stripes of gold braid.
 A staff of office (dikanikion) with carved knobs, with the first of plain gold, the second of gold bordered with silver braid, the third like the first, the fourth like the second, etc.

List of known holders

Byzantine Empire

Empire of Trebizond

Serbian Empire

References

Sources
 
 
 
 
 
 
 
 
 
 
 

 
Byzantine military offices
Lists of office-holders in the Byzantine Empire